Erlend Lesund (born 11 December 1994) is a Norwegian professional ice hockey player currently under contract with Rögle BK in the Swedish Hockey League (SHL) and the Norwegian national team.

Lesund played four seasons with Mora IK, including the last two in the SHL, before leaving out of contract to join fellow Swedish outfit, Rögle BK on a two-year contract on 12 April 2019.

Lesund participated at the 2017 IIHF World Championship.

Career statistics

Regular season and playoffs

International

References

External links

1994 births
Living people
Ice hockey players at the 2018 Winter Olympics
Olympic ice hockey players of Norway
Mora IK players
Manglerud Star Ishockey players
Norwegian ice hockey defencemen
Norwegian expatriate sportspeople in Sweden
Ice hockey people from Oslo
Sparta Warriors players